Karatepe is a village in the Merzifon District, Amasya Province, Turkey. Its population is 225 (2021).

References

Villages in Merzifon District